Sytykhiv is a village in Lviv Raion (district) of Lviv Oblast (province) of western Ukraine. It belongs to Lviv urban hromada, one of the hromadas of Ukraine. As of the 2001 All-Ukrainian Census, Sytykhiv's total population is 347.

It is believed that the name Sytykhiv is derived from the Proto-Slavic name Sebetikh. The first settlement in the location carried the name Sebetikhiv dvir. Its name later transformed into Setikhiv, and later Sytykhiv. The first written mention of the settlement dates back to 1571.

The only church in the city, the Church of the Assumption of the Blessed Virgin Mary is an example of traditional Ukrainian wooden church architecture. It was built in 1878 and is currently under jurisdiction of the Ukrainian Greek Catholic Church.

Until 18 July 2020, Sytykhiv belonged to Zhovkva Raion. The raion was abolished in July 2020 as part of the administrative reform of Ukraine, which reduced the number of raions of Lviv Oblast to seven. The area of Zhovkva Raion was merged into Lviv Raion.

References

Villages in Lviv Raion